Mathews is a surname. Notable persons with that surname include:

Alfred Augustus Mathews (1864 - 1946), vicar and Wales international rugby player, 1864-1946
Angelo Mathews (born 1987), Sri Lankan Burgher cricketer
Arthur Mathews (writer) (born 1959), Irish comedy writer
Arthur Frank Mathews (1860–1945), American painter
Basil Joseph Mathews (1879–1951), English historian 
Bill Mathews(1919–2003), Canadian geologist
Carl Mathews (1903–1959), American character actor and stuntman 
Carmen Mathews (1911–1995), American actress and environmentalist
Carole Mathews (1920–2014), American actress
Cornelius Mathews (1817–1889), 19th-century American writer
David Mathews (1739–1800), Loyalist mayor of New York, 1776-1783
Delia Mathews (born 1990), New Zealand-born ballet dancer
Eddie Mathews (1931–2001), Hall of Fame third baseman in Major League Baseball
Elbert G. Mathews (1910–1977), American diplomat
Francine Mathews (born 1963), American novelist
George Mathews (disambiguation), several people
Gregory Mathews (1876–1949), Australian amateur ornithologist
Harry Mathews (1930–2017), American author
Henry M. Mathews (1834–1884), governor of West Virginia, 1877-1881
James Mathews (disambiguation), several people
Jane Mathews (born 1940), Australian judge
Janet Mathews (1914–1992), Australian musician and linguist
Jay Mathews (born 1945), author, education reporter and online columnist with the Washington Post
Jessica Mathews (born 1946), president of the Carnegie Endowment for International Peace
John David Mathews, American engineer
Jon Mathews (1932–1979), academic
Jonathan Mathews, baseball coach
Kevin Mathews (born 1961), Singaporean musician and songwriter
Larry Mathews, Irish musician
Lloyd Mathews (1850–1901), British naval officer, politician and abolitionist
Marlene Mathews (born 1934), Australian sprinter
Max Mathews (1926–2011), computer music pioneer
Nancy Mowll Mathews (born 1947), Czech-American art historian, curator, and author
Oliver Mathews (c. 1520–c. 1618), Welsh apothecary and chronicler
Robert L. Mathews (1887–1947), American football player and coach
Ross Mathews (born 1979), American television personality
Sampson Mathews (c. 1737–1807), politician, Revolutionary War soldier
Sherin Mathews (2014–2017), Indian American toddler who was found dead in a culvert
Sylvia Mathews Burwell (born 1965), President of the Global Development Program of the Bill and Melinda Gates Foundation
Thomas Mathews (1676–1751), Royal Navy admiral
Vera Laughton Mathews (1888–1959), Director of the Women's Royal Naval Service from 1940 until 1946
Walter J. Mathews (1850–1947), American architect
William Mathews (disambiguation), several people

See also
Mathews I or Baselios Marthoma Mathews I (1907–1996), Supreme Primate of Malankara Church, also known as Indian Orthodox Church
Mathews II or Baselios Marthoma Mathews II (1915–2006) was the Supreme Primate of the Malankara Church, also known as Indian Orthodox Church
Mathews family, an American political family descended from John Mathews
Mathews (disambiguation)
Mathew
Matthews (surname)
Sir David ap Mathew